Loders is a village and civil parish in the English county of Dorset. It is a linear village, sited in the valley of the small River Asker, between Waddon Hill and Boarsbarrow Hill. In the 2011 census the parish had a population of 518.

The village school was opened in 1869 on land owned by the Nepean family of Loders Court. It was originally called Lady Nepean's School.

Description
The parish of Loders comprises three settlements. In the east is Uploders which has a public house, The Crown, and a chapel. To the west of Uploders and separated from it by a few fields is Yondover, where the village road crosses the River Asker. The village playing field and two farms are located here. West of Yondover and separated from it by the river and the disused railway line of the Bridport Railway branch line, is Lower Loders, generally known as just Loders. Lower Loders has a public house, The Loders Arms, a church, dedicated to St Mary Magdalen, a village hall, several farms, and a primary school, which celebrated its 150th anniversary in 2019. In his book Portrait of Dorset, Ralph Wightman gave an agricultural assessment of Loders as having "more than its share of soil variations but most of them are good soils. The result is a village of fertile fields but with an amazing difference in levels."

History
In 1086 Loders is mentioned in the Domesday Book as Lodres.

During the reign of Henry I, Baldwin de Redvers founded a seat of a Benedictine priory at Loders. The monks were reputedly the first to introduce cider-making into Dorset.

Governance
Loders lies within an electoral ward of the same name, which also includes the surrounding area from the edge of Bridport via Powerstock to North Poorton. The population of this ward was 1,697 at the 2011 census. The ward is one of 32 that comprise the West Dorset parliamentary constituency, which is currently represented in the UK national parliament by the Conservative Chris Loder, who succeeded Oliver Letwin in 2019.

In culture
Johnny Coppin's Westcountry Christmas album includes a song called Song for Loders, which mentions many places around the area, including Eggerton, Askerswell and Muckleford, amongst others.

When frost lies thick on Egerton
And every pool begins to freeze
From Muckleford to Nettle Coombe
And hills are hung with sparkling trees
Then to Loders we must go
Before the world is drowned in snow

References

External links 

Villages in Dorset